In the Czech Republic and Slovakia, pálenka is any kind of distilled beverage but especially fruit brandy. The term is often used generically for all kinds of liquors, including vodka, gin and borovička. The word derives from the Slavic verb *paliti 'to burn; to distill'.

Similar products exist in Austria and Hungary under the name pálinka, and in Romania, palincă.

Most traditional types of pálenka in Moravia and Slovakia are slivovica (plum spirit), ražná (grain spirit), borovička (a special kind of liquor distilled from the berries of Juniperus communis), hruškovica (pear spirit), jablkovica (apple spirit). Popular are also čerešňovica (cherry spirit) and marhuľovica (apricot spirit). Very distinctive among pálenkas are the ones distilled from fermented forest berries, including raspberries, blueberries, wild black thorn (planá trnka) and cranberries. Drienkovica (a spirit distilled from Cornelian cherries (Cornus mas) was popularized by the former Slovak president Rudolf Schuster.

The latter was quite popular prior to the First World War, and features prominently in the works of Jaroslav Hašek, Petr Bezruč and Sigmund Freud.

It was the title of a 2014 award-winning novel by Matěj Hořava, about a Czech-speaking minority community in a village in Romania in Banat.

See also
 Slivovitz (slivovica, slivovice) - a plum spirit, the most famous among fruit spirits
 Pálinka, name of the same liquor as pálenka adopted in Hungary
 Rakia, a similar spirit made throughout Southeastern Europe
 Țuică, an alcoholic drink in Romania, quite similar to Slivovitz.

References

Fruit brandies
Czech distilled drinks